Bilanka Ramayana, (ବିଲଙ୍କା ରାମାୟଣ) (also Vilanka Ramayana) is a 15th-century retelling of the Indian epic poem, the Ramayana, written by Sarala Dasa in Odia. The work is generally regarded as forming a supplementary kanda to the Odia Ramayana. It contains a metrical account of the battle between Rama and Ravana of Patala at an imaginary city called Vilanka in Patala, and differs from the account in the Sanskrit epic in that it is written in special glorification of Sita, who, as an apotheosis of the goddess Kali, is represented to have helped Rama to slay the demon Ravana of Patala with 1,000 heads. The story is written as a poem.

References

Hindu poetry
Odia literature
Works based on the Ramayana
15th-century poems